Ingeborg Ann-Charlotte (Anna-Lotta) Larsson, (born 5 April 1954) is a Swedish singer and actress. She educated to be a voice coach at Framås folkhögskola and then was accepted into the Operahögskolan in Gothenburg. She is also an actress, known for her roles in the film Värmlänningarna in 1980 and the series Nya tider. She also presented the show Har du hört den förut? which was broadcast on SVT.

Anna-Lotta Larsson also works with dubbing of animated children's films.

Discography
1985 – Natt efter natt
1986 – A piacère
1989 – Vädur
1990 – Tidvatten
1992 – Fem
1995 – Jag ser dig i smyg
1998 – Just vid den här tiden
2003 – Tidlöst
2004 – Känn en doft av kärleken
2007 – Kärleken förde oss samman
2010 – Saknad

Filmography
1980 – Snövit och de sju dvärgarna (Voice of Snowwhite)
1981 – Göta kanal
1981 – Micke och Molle (Voice of Vixie)
1984 – Jönssonligan får guldfeber
1991 – Isbjörnskungen
1992 – Hassel – Utpressarna
1997 – Bondånger (TV-series)
1997 – En fyra för tre (TV-series)
1999 – Nya tider (TV-serie)
2002 – Lilo & Stitch (Swedish voice of Nani)
2004 – Kogänget
2006 – Ice Age 2
2007 – Harry Potter och Fenixorden (Swedish voice of Dolores Umbridge)
2009 – Karaokekungen
2013 – Frost (Swedish voice of Gerda)

References

Living people
1954 births
Swedish actresses
People from Karlstad